At Home with Amy Sedaris is an American surreal comedy television series that premiered on October 24, 2017, on truTV. Hosted by Amy Sedaris playing various characters, the show focuses on the comedian's love of entertaining, crafts, and cooking. The series was met with critical acclaim upon its premiere, garnering a nomination for Outstanding Variety Sketch Program at the 70th Primetime Emmy Awards. The second season premiered on February 19, 2019, and the third season premiered on May 20, 2020. On January 19, 2021, the series was canceled after three seasons.

Premise
At Home with Amy Sedaris follows Sedaris as she demonstrates "her diverse but necessary homemaking skills."

Cast and characters

Main
Amy Sedaris as herself, Patty Hogg, Ronnie Vino, Hobo, and  Nutmeg

Recurring

Heather Lawless as Ruth, the Lady Who Lives in the Woods
Ana Fabrega as Esther
Cole Escola as Chassie Tucker
David Pasquesi as Tony Pugnalata
Matt Malloy as Leslie Hogg (seasons 2-3)
Moujan Zolfaghari as Puja
John Early as Russell Schnabble
Darrell Hammond as Jacob, Chad Chutney, Colonel Hogg and Radio Voice
Adam Selman as Hickory, Snake Bite Victim and Choking Man
Justin Theroux as Colonel Cary Commander, Sea Captain and Hip Guy
Jackie Hoffman as Murder She Cooked Narrator, Winifred Snood and Peg D'Peeves
Michael Shannon as Julien Pendrel, Johnny Shannon and Tom Jefferson
Michael Stipe as himself 
Paul Dinello as Hercules, Barry Teaberry and Jesus  (seasons 1-2)
Callie Thorne as Dr. Claire Shanks and Madge (seasons 1-2)
Jane Krakowski as herself and Beverly (seasons 1, 3)
Peter Serafinowicz as Captain  Benton Cize and Turtleneck Man (seasons 1, 3)
Josh Hamilton as Stieger and Dan (seasons 1, 3)
Talya Mar as Ariel and Loretta Biscuit (seasons 1, 3)
Rachel Dratch as Florence Chervil and Miss Elva DeFossil (seasons 1, 3)
Brian Stack as Narrator  (season 1)
Cindy Caponera as Linda Mungus and Cop (season 1)
Vanessa Walters as Bear and Snowman (season 1)
Bridget Everett as Teresa and Crystal Dangles (seasons 2-3)
Paul W. Downs as Lance Henning and Chris Linnseed (seasons 2-3)
Frederick Weller as Walter and Blaze (seasons 2-3)
Ana Gasteyer as Darlene Cornish and Colleen (seasons 2-3)
Richard Kind as Sugar Griz and Lenny (seasons 2-3)
Christein Aromando as Artemis (season 2)
Leo Fitzpatrick as Pudge (season 2)
Jessica Walter as Alice Brittlecrunch (season 2)
Ann Dowd as Terri Tucker and Janice Shanks (seasons 2-3)

Guest

Paul Giamatti as Mr. Olgilvey ("TGIF")
Todd Barry as Mr. Handley ("TGIF")
Scott Adsit as Panos Sakos ("Cooking for One")
Nick Kroll as Randy Fingerling ("Gift Giving")
Callie Thorne as Dr. Claire Shanks ("Gift Giving")
John Early as Russell ("Gift Giving")
Stephen Colbert as himself ("Gift Giving")
Chris Elliott as Rich Uncle ("Entertaining for Peanuts")
Jonathan Hadary as Sully ("Nature")
Christopher Meloni as Ranger Russell Biscuit ("Nature")
Neil Patrick Harris as himself ("Holidays")
David Costabile as Clarence ("Holidays")
Aidy Bryant as Mulaak ("Out of This World")
Dale Soules as Delta Mung ("Making Love")
Sasheer Zamata as Ms. Stern ("Making Love")
Matthew Broderick as Cliff Wilt ("Teenagers")
Fred Armisen as Maximiliano ("Hospital-tality")
Juliette Lewis as Taffney Tucker ("Hospital-tality")
Taryn Manning as Tambi Tucker ("Hospital-tality")
David Krumholtz as Angelo DiBeverly ("Game Night")
Susan Sarandon as herself ("Anniversary")
Ellie Kemper as herself ("Anniversary")
Janeane Garofalo as herself ("Anniversary")
Greta Lee as herself ("Anniversary")
Wade McCollum as Skeleton ("Halloween")
Billy Crudup as Dr. Raddish ("Halloween")
Debra Monk as Mrs. Bjornson ("Thanksgiving")
John Ventimiglia as Sugar Man ("Confectionaries")
Michael Cera as Travis ("Valentine's Day")
Jason Sudeikis as himself ("Travel")
Peter Serafinowicz as Captain Benton Cize ("Travel")
David Koechner as Clovis ("Outdoor Entertaining")
Sunita Mani as Denise Hershey Musgrave ("Signature Dishes")
David Alan Grier as Pippen ("Inspiration")
Arturo Castro as Castrodamus ("New Year's")
Paul Rudd as Melisso Junkins ("New Year's")
Michael McKean as Guy Lombardi ("New Year's")
Chris Parnell as Chug Ducey ("New Year's")

Episodes

Season 1 (2017)

Season 2 (2019)

Season 3 (2020)

Production

Background
Sedaris grew up in the 1960s and 1970s in Raleigh, North Carolina and learned to cook at a young age. She frequently watched local hospitality shows like WTVD's At Home with Peggy Mann and WRAL's The Bette Elliott Show. These shows inspired the initial concept of the show. Describing Mann's influence, Sedaris has said, "She would do cooking and crafting, and she would have local people on to talk about their businesses. It was very boring and I was obsessed with Peggy Mann. I liked the idea of pretending you had a show happening in your home." She also researched entertainers like Lawrence Welk and Dinah Shore, as well as vintage educational programs and public access shows, which served as inspiration for the specific tone and off-kilter sensibility of the series.

Sedaris conceived the show 20 years ago and eventually developed it into a satire on various famous homemakers including Martha Stewart.

Development
On January 14, 2017, it was announced during the Television Critics Association's annual winter press tour that TruTV had given the production a series order for a first season consisting of ten episodes. Executive producers were set to include Amy Sedaris, Paul Dinello, Alyson Levy, John Lee, and Vernon Chatman. Production companies involved with the series were slated to consist of PFFR.

On April 18, 2018, it was announced that truTV had renewed the series for a second season consisting of ten episodes with A24 joining the series as an additional production company. On December 11, 2018, it was reported that the second season would premiere on February 19, 2019.

On April 23, 2020, it was announced that the third season would premiere on May 20, 2020. On January 19, 2021, TruTV canceled the series after three seasons.

Casting
Alongside the initial series order announcement, it was confirmed that the series would star Amy Sedaris. On December 11, 2018, it was announced that guest stars in the second season would include Rose Byrne, Matthew Broderick, Justin Theroux, Susan Sarandon, Ann Dowd, Gillian Jacobs, Juliette Lewis, Ellie Kemper, Fred Armisen, Michael Shannon, Martha Plimpton, Jessica Walter, Campbell Scott, Billy Crudup, Bridget Everett, Julie Klausner, Paul W. Downs, Janeane Garofalo, Richard Kind, Thomas Lennon, David Krumholtz, Ana Gasteyer, Darrell Hammond, Jackie Hoffman, John Early, James Monroe Iglehart, and Matt Malloy.

Release

Marketing
On July 27, 2017, a clip from the first season was released featuring Jane Krakowski. On September 22, 2018, a trailer for the first season was released. On December 13, 2018, a series of still images from the second season were released. On January 18, 2019, a trailer for the second season was released.

Premiere
On September 22, 2017, the series held its world premiere during the 1st Annual Tribeca TV Festival in New York City. Following a screening, a discussion moderated by Andy Cohen was held with Amy Sedaris and Paul Dinello. October 23, 2017, the series held another screening during the 13th Annual New York Television Festival in New York City. Following the screening, a conversation was held with Amy Sedaris.

Reception

Critical response
The series was met with a positive response from critics upon its premiere. On the review aggregation website Rotten Tomatoes, the first season holds a 100% approval rating with an average rating of 8.25 out of 10 based on 15 reviews. The second season holds a 100% approval rating based on 5 reviews. Metacritic, which uses a weighted average, assigned the series a score of 82 out of 100, based on 5 critics, indicating "universal acclaim".

In a positive review, Verne Gay of Newsweek gave the first season three and a half stars out of four and commented, "Sedaris remains, as ever, hilarious, inventive, unbalanced and deeply, joyously, shamelessly twisted. Her new show's not bad either. At Home With Amy Sedaris is each of those [The Frugal Gourmet, Barefoot Contessa, Paula's Home Cooking, and 30 Minute Meals], on acid." Danette Chavez of The A.V. Club praised the series saying, "Sedaris has an earnest desire to share her unique brand of hospitality. What she mixes up here is cozy and kooky, with a side of depravity." James Poniewozik of The New York Times said in positive review that, "each episode is a self-contained distillation of Ms. Sedaris's talents and HGTV-meets-Adult-Swim sensibility. Even in an age of oddball TV experiments, there really is no place like At Home."

Awards and nominations

References

External links

2010s American surreal comedy television series
2010s American television talk shows
2010s American variety television series
2020s American surreal comedy television series
2020s American television talk shows
2020s American variety television series
2017 American television series debuts
2020 American television series endings
English-language television shows
Television series about television
Television shows set in North Carolina
TruTV original programming